The Interest of Love is a South Korean television series starring Yoo Yeon-seok, Moon Ga-young, Keum Sae-rok, and Jung Ga-ram,  based on a novel of the same Korean title by writer Lee Hyuk-jin. It aired from December 21, 2022 to February 9, 2023, on JTBC's Wednesdays and Thursdays at 22:30 (KST) time slot. It is also available for streaming on Netflix in selected regions.

Synopsis
The series follows the story of four young adults with different interests who meet each other at the Yeongpo branch of KCU Bank as they seek to understand the meaning of love.

Cast

Main
 Yoo Yeon-seok as Ha Sang-soo: a manager at KCU Bank's Yeongpo branch who desires a normal lifestyle and believes that an unshakable life is the key to happiness.
 Moon Seong-hyun as young Ha Sang-soo
 Moon Ga-young as Ahn Soo-young: a fourth-year head teller at KCU Bank's Yeongpo branch who views love as a sand castle that can collapse in an instant, but finds herself feeling excited because of a man who suddenly appears in her life.
 Keum Sae-rok as Park Mi-kyung: the self-assertive and straightforward assistant manager of the PB team of KCU Bank's Yeongpo branch who grew up in a wealthy family.
 Jung Ga-ram as Jeong Jong-hyun: a sincere and diligent man who dreams of becoming a police officer and works as a bank security guard.

Supporting

KCU Bank's Yeongpo branch
 Moon Tae-yu as So Kyung-pil: Sang-soo's friend who is the chief of the general affairs department.
 Jeong Jae-sung as Yook Si-kyung: branch manager.
 Lee Hwa-ryong as Noh Tae-pyeong: deputy manager.
 Park Hyung-soo as Lee Gu-il: a team leader.
 Lee Si-hoon as Ma Du-sik: an assistant manager.
 Yang Jo-ah as Seo Min-hee: a team leader.
 Jo In as Bae Eun-jung: a manager.
 Oh Dong-min as Yang Seok-hyun: Sang-soo's friend who is an insider and a deputy.
 Oh So-hyun as Kim Ji-yoon: the youngest bank clerk.

Others
 Seo Jeong-yeon as Han Jeong-im: Sang-soo's mother.
 Park Mi-hyun as Shim Kyung-sook: Soo-young's mother.
 Park Yoon-hee as Ahn In-jae: Soo-young's father.
 Yoon Yoo-sun as Yoon Mi-sun: Mi-kyung's mother.
 Park Sung-geun as Park Dae-sung: Mi-kyung's father.

Extended
 Jo Yoon-soo as Cha Seon-jae: a high school student who dreams of becoming a police officer.

Viewership

Notes

References

External links
  
 
 
 
 

Korean-language television shows
JTBC television dramas
Television series by JTBC Studios
South Korean melodrama television series
South Korean romance television series
South Korean workplace television series
Television shows based on South Korean novels
2022 South Korean television series debuts
2023 South Korean television series endings
Korean-language Netflix exclusive international distribution programming